Asclepiodotus Tacticus (fl. 1st century BC), also known as Asclepiodotus, was a Greek writer and philosopher known for his treatise on military tactics.

Life 
Little is known about the life of Asclepiodiotus. The Greek manuscripts read “(of) Asclepiodotus the Philosopher” (Ἀσκληπιοδότου φιλοσόφου) and he has been identified with the Asclepiodotus mentioned by Seneca in his Naturales quaestiones. Seneca quotes Asclepiodotus on matters of natural history and also reports that he was a student of Posidonius, who, as mentioned by Aelianus Tacticus, also wrote a treatise on military tactics. If Asclepiodotus was indeed the student of Posidonius, he would likely have been born in the late 2nd century or 1st century BCE and probably studied in Rhodes, where Posidonius had a school.

Works 

Asclepiodotus' only known work is a treatise in twelve chapters on military tactics and theory (Ἀσκληπιοδότου φιλοσόφου τακτικὰ κεφάλαια, or Tactics). This text was transmitted in the Codex Laurentianus (Plut.55.4) and eleven other manuscripts dependent on it (see below). Along with the text, the manuscripts transmit figures thought to be copies of diagrams by Asclepiodotus' own hand.

The Tactics was a theoretical text that seems to have served no practical use, following a general trend in Hellenistic and Roman texts on warfare, both scientific and tactical. Poznanski, however, stresses the practical, non-theoretical nature of the work, which, among other things, is irreplaceable for our knowledge of the vocabulary on the phalanx and other military terminology of the Hellenistic period.

The treatise focuses on the phalanx, its divisions, and its position, and discusses other topics, such as peltasts and cavalry. Some aspects of warfare discussed in the treatise, such as battle chariots and elephants, were no longer in use in the first century BCE, suggesting that either he used earlier Hellenistic armies as models, or he based his work on an earlier text.

The style of the text is terse. As Oldfather, et al. describe, "little effort is made to vary the almost inevitable monotony of a treatise on such a subject; the sentences are short and stiff, the language unimaginative … the whole is dry, but most orderly." Items of historical interest are rare, though occasionally preserved, e.g. that the Thessalian cavalry fought in rhomboid formation.

Some materials in the Tactics seem to be derived from Polybius, or earlier textbooks. The relationship between Asclepiodotus' treatise on military tactics and Posidonius' treatise on the same subject is unclear. Kai Brodersen argues that Posidonius' text was either directly or indirectly a template for Asclepiodotus' text and also for Aelianus Tacticus' On Tactical Arrays of the Greeks (Περὶ στρατηγικῶν τάξεων Ἑλληνικῶν) and Arrian's Ars tactica (Τἐχνη τακτικἠ). Another theory is that Asclepiodotus' treatise was "the skeleton outline of the lectures delivered by his master [Posidonius]."

Asclepiodotus' Tactics was the main source, at least of the extant texts, for Aelian's On Tactical Arrays of the Greeks. However, when Aelianus Tacticus lists the authors who influenced his work, he does not acknowledge Asclepiodotus. Oldfather. et al. provide two possible explanations. The first is that Aelian did not want to call attention to the extent of his obligation. The second is that Asclepiodotus merely transmitted the text of Posidonius, whom Aelian does acknowledge.

Asclepiodotus also wrote on natural history, some topics of which are preserved by Seneca in his Naturales Quaestiones. These include earthquakes and volcanic eruptions, the nature of winds, and the character of subterranean water.

Editions of the Tactics 

Angelo Mai: Spicilegium Romanum, vol. IV, Rome 1840, pp. 577-581 (Latin; only chapters 1–2, from a very late manuscript)
Hermann Köchly and Wilhelm Rüstow: Griechische Kriegsschriftsteller, Bd. II, I: Die Taktiker (Asklepiodotos, Aelianus), Leipzig 1855, pp. 130-197 (German; editio princeps; from later manuscripts; the Codex Laurentianus was unknown to Köchly and Rüstow)
William Oldfather, et al.: Aeneas Tacticus, Asclepiodotus, Onasander (Loeb Classical Library 156), London and Cambridge: Harvard University Press. 1923 (English; from the Codex Laurentianus)
 Lucien Poznanski: Asclépiodote, Traité de tactique (Collection des Universités de France), Paris 1992; Nachdruck 2002 (French; definitive edition)
 Giuseppe Cascarino: Tecnica della falange. In Appendice: “Il Trattoto Tactico di Asclepiodoto,” Città del Castello: Il Cerchio, 2011 (Italian)
 Kai Brodersen: Arrianos, Asklepiodotos: Die Kunst der Taktik, Berlin and Boston: De Gruyter, 2017 (German).

Manuscripts of the Tactics

Notes

References and further reading
Bandini, A.-M., Rostagno, E., Festa, N., Kudlein, F. Catalogus codicum manuscriptorum Bibliothecae Mediceae Laurentianae, t. I-III, Leipzig, 1961.
Brodersen, K. (Ed.) (2017). Arrianos, Asklepiodotos: Die Kunst der Taktik. Berlin, Boston: De Gruyter. .
Burckhardt, L. “Asclepiodotus, [2] Military theoretician (1st cent. BC),” Brill's New Pauly. Antiquity volumes edited by: Hubert Cancik and Helmuth Schneider. Brill, 2008. Brill Online.
Campbell, B. "Asclepiodotus." Oxford Classical Dictionary, 2012.
Cascarino, G. Tecnica della falange. Città del Castello: Il Cerchio, 2011.
Chisholm, H., ed. (1911). "Asclepiodotus.” Encyclopædia Britannica (11th ed.), Vol. 2. Cambridge University Press.
Hanson, V. "The modern historiography of ancient warfare." In P. Sabin, H. Van Wees, & M. Whitby (Eds.), The Cambridge History of Greek and Roman Warfare (pp. 1–21). Cambridge: Cambridge University Press, 2007.
Köchly, H. and Rüstow, W. Griechische Kriegsschriftsteller, Bd. II I: Die Taktiker (Asklepiodotos, Aelianus), Leipzig: Wilhelm Engelmann,1855.
Mai, A., Spicilegium Romanum, vol. IV, Rome: Typis Collegi Urbani, 1840.
Oldfather, W. "Notes on the Text of Asklepiodotus," The American Journal of Philology, 41. no. 2 (1920): 127–146.
Oldfather, W., et al: Aeneas Tacticus, Asclepiodotus, Onasander (Loeb Classical Library 156), London and Cambridge: Harvard University Press. 1923.
Sekunda, N. "The Budé Asclepiodotus - Lucien Poznanski (ed., tr.): Asclépiodote, Traité de Tactique, (Association Guillaume Budé) Pp. xxvii 62 (texte double); 47 figs. Paris: Les Belles Lettres, 1992," The Classical Review, 44. no. 1 (1994): 36–37.

External links
Asclepiodotus (complete text of the English translation, from the Loeb edition)
Asclepiodotus (complete Greek text from the Loeb edition)
Digitized manuscript of Asclepiodotus (Grec 2522) from the Bibliothèque nationale de France, with archival information
Digitized manuscript of Asclepiodotus (Grec 2528) from the Bibliothèque nationale de France, with archival information

1st-century BC Greek people
Ancient Greek military writers
Ancient Roman philosophers
Year of birth unknown
Year of death unknown